Hindu wedding cards or invitations are hallmark Hindu marriage rituals and customs which are entangled with eternal bonding, affection, and blessing. The lavish traditions are highlighted with opulently colored Hindu wedding invitations aesthetically designed in handmade paper and designs enriched with heartfelt emotions. Hindu invitations symbolize glitter, lively mood, and fun of the matrimonial ceremony. These cards are not only to inform and invite, rather, but also express style and the theme of the special day.

Religious symbols such as Lord Ganesha and Mangal Ghat are embedded in rich textures to seek the blessings of God.  The relevance of Hindu invitations has undergone a radical change since the origin of Hindu weddings all across the globe. It is also said giving cards to the Old People of family first to shower their blessings on the couple. Hindu wedding card is the card which is used to invite people and show importance of them in family

Invitation Features

Invitation wordings
An invitation wording is a compilation of various wedding invitation verses, wordings and text templates for all the special ceremonies. From the wedding invitation text, it is possible to get a comprehensive idea about the type of wedding: for instance, whether it is a Hindu or Christian wedding celebration. In the same manner, Hindu invitations are incomplete without wordings. The wordings have a significant relevance while designing a perfect card. The invitation wordings in a Hindu wedding card are very formal, and wordings are used in the card for various ceremonies which include mehandi, engagement, wedding sangeet, wedding ceremony and reception invitation wording.

Printable symbols
Various types of printable symbols such as Lord Ganesha, Om, and Mangal Ghat are available for all Hindu wedding invitation cards. These symbols have religious significance. Sometimes, the bride and groom also select symbols based on the theme. Various classic, as well as artistic symbols, are used in Hindu cards. The printable symbols are very uniquely designed to give a perfect look to the Hindu wedding invitation cards. It also adds grace to the card with a new redefined look. The symbols are widely used all across the globe and becoming more and more well-known day by day.

Printing techniques

The printing methods used in printing wedding invitation cards have seen a radical transformation with technological advancement. As the invitation wording and design hint at the wedding style, in the same manner, the printing technique chosen will convey how formal the whole wedding ceremony is. The type of printing technique selected will also have a large impact on the wedding budget, and it will help in choosing the design and paper type. With the availability of high-standard printing techniques, Hindu invitations can be printed by diverse methods like flocking, embossing, hot foil stamping, laser cutting, raised silk screen printing, offset printing, letterpress, thermography, engraving and more to give a new multidimensional look to the invitation cards. The choice is based on what kind of look is desired and what the allocated budget for it is.

Theme-based cards
Hindu wedding cards are also designed as per the wedding theme. The bride and groom seek a unique wedding celebration, so theme-based weddings around the globe have seen a tremendous rise. Weddings are now the best launchpad to show the world how unique a marriage celebration can be: for instance, Hollywood glamour themes, medieval themes, Harry Potter themes, or ethnic theme-based weddings.

Types of paper
Technological advancements and growing interest in a graceful wedding have given rise to selecting diverse paper types for wedding invitation cards. Hindu cards are printed on diverse types of paper such as:
 Shimmery metallic paper
 Matte-finish boards
 Fabric paper
 Handmade metallic paper
 Handmade silk paper
 Handmade cotton paper
 Velvet paper
 Vellum paper

Add-on cards
With changing times, the demand for add-on cards has risen two-fold with main wedding invitation cards. Now, these are used to complement the main Hindu wedding cards. To complement the main Hindu wedding invitation, there are various matching add-on cards such as:
 RSVP cards
 Thank you cards
 Program booklets
 Menu cards
 Place cards

See also
Hindu philosophy
Hindu Wedding
Marriage in Hinduism
Puja

References

Marriage in Hinduism